Ivan Shadr, pseudonym of Ivan Dmitriyevich Ivanov (— 3 April 1941) was a Russian/Soviet sculptor and medalist who took his pseudonym after his hometown of Shadrinsk.

Biography 
Shadr studied at the Artistic Industrial School in Yekaterinburg from 1903 to 1907, and from 1907 to 1908 at the Drawing School of the Imperial Society for the Encouragement of the Arts in St Petersburg where the famous Nicholas Roerich was his teacher. He furthered his education under Auguste Rodin and Emile-Antoine Bourdelle in Paris (1910–1911), and in Rome (1911–1912).

Shadr's early works, such as the project for the Monument to the World's Suffering (1916), were designed according to the principles of Art Nouveau. After the 1917 Revolution he was an active participant in the execution of the Monumental Propaganda Plan, in particular, he sculptured reliefs depicting the Socialist ideological leaders Karl Marx, Karl Liebknecht, and Rosa Luxemburg, as well as some sixteen separate monuments to Vladimir Lenin.

In these years the characteristics of Shadr’s style were consolidated: an elevated, romantic organization of the figures and an emotional, dynamic composition. Among his most famous and characteristic works are sculptures The Cobblestone Is the Weapon of the Proletariat (1927) and Girl with an Oar (1936).

In the 1920s, Shadr together with sculptor Piotr Tayozhny came up with one of the first designs of the Order of Lenin, the highest Soviet award. Shadr also worked for Goznak, including on designing new Soviet money that included the symbols of that time: a worker, a peasant and a Red Army soldier.  Those sculptures remarkable for their vigorous and dynamic typical characters can be seen nowadays in the Russian Museum (plaster casts) and in the Tretyakov Gallery (bronze sculptures).

Shadr died in Moscow and in 1952 was awarded the Stalin Prize posthumously.  He is buried in Novodevichy Cemetery in Moscow, where his sculptural work can also been seen at the grave of Nadezhda Alliluyeva, the second wife of Stalin, and the grave of theater director Vladimir Nemirovich-Danchenko.

Selected work
 The Cobblestone Is the Weapon of the Proletariat, bronze, 1927, multiple versions
 A colossal statue of Lenin at the Zemo-Avchaly Hydroelectric Power Station (ZAGES), near Tbilisi, 1927, removed 1991
 Girl with an Oar, multiple versions created in 1935 and 1936

See also
 List of Russian artists

External links 

 Ivan Shadr, Russian Sculptor and Artist

1887 births
1941 deaths
People from Kurgan Oblast
People from Chelyabinsky Uyezd
20th-century Russian sculptors
Russian male sculptors
Socialist realist artists
Soviet sculptors
Stalin Prize winners
Burials at Novodevichy Cemetery